The Return of the Spice Girls Tour was the third concert tour by British girl group the Spice Girls. It was the group's first tour since Christmas in Spiceworld in 1999, and their first with all five members since the Spiceworld Tour in May 1998. Across 45 shows (out of 47), the tour sold 581,066 tickets for a box-office gross of $70.1 million, and earned an additional $100 million from merchandising. Overall, the tour was the eighth-highest-grossing concert tour of 2008. The 17-night sellout stand at London's O2 Arena was the highest-grossing engagement of the year, taking in $33.8 million and drawing an audience of 256,647, winning the 2008 Billboard Touring Award for Top Boxscore. This was the last tour to feature Victoria Beckham.

Background
On 28 June 2007, the Spice Girls held a press conference at the O2 Arena in London, formally announcing their intention to reunite as a group, a plan that had long been speculated by the media. During the press conference, the group laid out their plans to embark on a world concert tour that would be seen as a celebration of the group's history and to tour as a quintet for the last time. Initially, eleven dates were announced and spanned North America, Europe, Asia, Oceania, Africa and South America and fans were informed that they had to pre-register for tickets on the group's website. On 30 September, the successful applicants for the Los Angeles, Las Vegas, Vancouver and London concerts were informed of how they could purchase their tickets, via email and text alerts, from valid ticket vendors. Demand was so high that many dates quickly sold out and new dates in London were immediately announced after the first date at the O2 Arena sold out in only 38 seconds. Sixteen additional dates in London were eventually added, all selling out within one minute.

Concert synopsis

The show begins with a video introduction of five young girls playing inside a house when they find a magic box. When they open it fireworks appear, the five girls all wish to become pop stars when they grow up, then an instrumental of "Spice Up Your Life" begins as various music videos and press headlines about the Spice Girls are shown, as the video ends the Spice Girls enter the stage on five platforms and perform "Spice Up Your Life" they then perform a mashup of their 1998 hit "Stop" and "It's Like That" by Jason Nevins and Run-DMC, which famously blocked "Stop" from the number 1 position on the UK Singles Chart. After the girls introduce themselves at the end of the second song they perform "Say You'll Be There" remixed with "Fix" by Blackstreet. Their reunion single "Headlines (Friendship Never Ends)" is the last song in the first act. The second act begins with a jazz theme for "The Lady Is A Vamp" having a showgirl-style performance. An up-tempo jazz version of "Too Much" is performed with the group dressed in tuxedos, while doing a striptease behind neon pink-coloured, heart-shaped doors. "2 Become 1" is performed next while each of the girls emerged from a cocoon of oversized swan wings and danced around a set of barber's poles while singing the song.

The third act begins with a video of falling money and the titles Baby, Posh, Sporty, Scary and Ginger appear on the screen with their signature themes. Geri Halliwell then enters the stage wearing a sequin Union Jack dress, while Emma Bunton wears a small pink coat, and Melanie C appears wearing a sports track suit. Victoria Beckham then appears wearing a little black lace dress, while Mel B wears her trademark leopard print catsuit, and the group perform "Who Do You Think You Are". The song symbolises the height of the Spice Girls in their heyday. Beckham is then left on stage giving a Catwalk / Runway dance to a remix of "Like a Virgin" by Madonna and "Supermodel (You Better Work)" by Ru Paul. Mel B then performs solo, taking a male member of the audience and subsequently chains him to a ladder as she performs a cover of "Are You Gonna Go My Way" by Lenny Kravitz. Bunton gives a 1960s-inspired performance of her 2004 hit "Maybe".

Following a cape dance interlude, "Viva Forever" is performed with a Latin theme and tango/fan dance break, the song ends with Halliwell exiting the stage early, acknowledging her leaving the band in 1998. "Holler" is then performed by the four remaining members, with a dominatrix theme similar to the video of the song. Halliwell then returns solo to perform her single "It's Raining Men", followed by Melanie C who performs her song, "I Turn to You". Mel B, Melanie C, Bunton, and Beckham then perform "Let Love Lead the Way" dressed in white and silver. Halliwell returns from under the stage at the end of the song. The five girls come together holding hands and walk to the center stage, raising their hands to signify the reunion as a five piece and their bond. They then perform "Mama" with personal photographs of themselves with their mothers and children. For the British shows, fifty young girls from the Capital Children's Choir dressed in white came out from a platform and lined the stage against the backdrop screens to sing with the Spice Girls. This was then followed by the "Celebration Medley", a mash-up of "Celebration", "Shake Your Body (Down to the Ground)", "That's The Way (I Like It)", and "We Are Family". The girls then perform "Goodbye".

The encore begins with a "Humpty Dance" interlude by the dancers as it segues into "If U Cant Dance" with the girls wearing a different coloured robe. The girls then take off their robes to reveal glittery outfits: Mel B in gold, Halliwell in blue, Melanie C in orange, Beckham in green, and Bunton in pink. They then perform their biggest hit and debut single "Wannabe". Finally they perform a heavily remixed version of "Spice Up Your Life". At the end, a cannon exploded showering the stage with pieces of gold, white and black paper strips, while flags from different countries flashed across the backdrop screens.

Controversy 

In late 2007, a fake email was posted by blogger Perez Hilton on his site, stating that the Spice Girls had cancelled the Buenos Aires date, causing an official statement to be released saying that Buenos Aires and the other world tour dates were being finalized. Due to the expansion of the British and American legs of the tour, it was finally announced on 1 February 2008 that the tour would end in Toronto, on 26 February 2008, meaning that the dates in South America, Asia, Australia and Africa were cancelled. Many media outlets reported that it was due to Melanie C and Mel B leaving the group, but this was denied in an official video message. The band suffered fan backlash, with some fans creating Facebook hate groups speculating that the official announcement was "indirect" and that "the Spice Girls and their management knew the dates were cancelled even before they added 16 dates at the O2, deciding to announce it near the end of the tour to minimize controversy."

Broadcasts and recordings 
BBC Radio 2 recorded the shows in London on 15 and 16 December 2007. An hour-long "highlights special" was broadcast on 22 and 31 December 2007, that included eleven of the twenty-two songs performed. It was confirmed on the Spice Girls official website that there would not be a DVD release. The lack of an official DVD released caused negativity. After many e-mails from fans to the management, it was officially announced that no official DVD had been recorded at all. However, Mel B confirmed on her website that footage of the tour was recorded but the quality was poor and they felt it was wrong to release a DVD for local distribution. In 2017, Melanie C clarified in a YouTube interview that although the concerts had recording for the on-stage video-screens and promotional purposes, a DVD was never recorded due to "poor organization". Because the tour sold out quickly, it was impossible to have empty seats and make room for cameramen and extra lighting, making it impossible to film a high-quality DVD.

In May 2020, two previously unseen video-screen recordings in New York and Philadelphia were uploaded online by Ivan "Flipz" Valez, who was one of the dancers.

Set list 
The following set list is representative of the show on 2 December 2007. It is not representative of all concerts for the duration of the tour.

"Spice Up Your Life"
"Stop"
"Say You'll Be There" 
"Headlines (Friendship Never Ends)"
"The Lady Is a Vamp"
"Too Much"
"2 Become 1"
"Who Do You Think You Are"
"Like A Virgin" / "Supermodel (You Better Work)" 
"Are You Gonna Go My Way" 
"Maybe" 
"Viva Forever"
"Holler"
"It's Raining Men" 
"I Turn to You" 
"Let Love Lead the Way"
"Mama"
 "Celebration" / "Shake Your Body (Down to the Ground)" / "That's the Way (I Like It)" / "We Are Family" 
"Goodbye"
Encore
"If U Can't Dance"
"Wannabe" 
"Spice Up Your Life"

Tour dates

Cancelled dates

Personnel

Vocals 

 Mel B
 Emma Bunton
 Geri Halliwell 
 Victoria Beckham
 Melanie C

Band 

Simon Ellis – Musical Director / Keyboards
Paul Gendler – Guitars
Greg Hatwell – Guitars
Nick Nasmyth – Keyboards
Scott Firth – Bass
Sudha Kheterpal or Thomas Dyani – Percussion
Vinnie Lammi – Drums

Dancers 

Gus Carr (Dance Captain)
Scotty Nguyen (Dance Captain)
Alex Larson
Antonio Hudnell
Cassidy Noblett
Dougie Styles
Ivan "Flipz" Valez
Leo Moctezuma
Victor Rojas
Vinh Bui

Main crew
 Musical Director: Simon Ellis
 Creative Director: Jamie King
 Production & Lighting: LeRoy A. Bennett
 Assistant Director: Carla Kama
 Supervising Choreographer: Stefanie Roos
 Video Director: Dago Gonzalez for Veneno, Inc.
 Costume Design: Roberto Cavalli
 Manager: Simon Fuller
 Executive Producer: Spice Girls and 19

Notes

References 

Spice Girls concert tours
2007 concert tours
2008 concert tours
Reunion concert tours